Elections in Delhi, the National Capital Territory of India are 
conducted in accordance with the Constitution of India. The Assembly of 
Delhi creates laws regarding the conduct of local body elections 
unilaterally while any changes by the state legislature to the conduct 
of state level elections needs to be approved by the Parliament of India.
In addition, the state legislature may be dismissed by the Parliament 
according to Article 356 of the Indian Constitution and President's rule may be imposed.

Main political parties
The Bharatiya Janata Party (BJP), Indian National Congress (INC) and Aam Aadmi Party (AAP) are the major political parties in Delhi. In the past, various parties such as Bharatiya Jana Sangh (BJS), Janata Party (JP) and Bahujan Samaj Party (BSP) were also influential in the territory.

Lok Sabha elections

Keys:

Vidhan Sabha elections

Metropolitan Council elections

Municipal Corporation elections

References

External links
Election Commission of India

 
 
History of Delhi (1947–present)